"You Think You Know Her" is a 1990 song by American synth-pop band Cause&Effect.

Background
It was first released as a single in 1990, and was re-released in 1991 by Sedona Recording Company as a promo version. Tracks are identical to the Exile/Nastymix CD single released in 1990; only the remix titles have been renamed.

Track listing

12" maxi-single
Catalog #:NMR 74002-1

Side A
 "You Think You Know Her" (The Deception Mix) (8:00)
 "You Think You Know Her" (The Devious Dub) (7:10)
 "You Think You Know Her" (The Deceptive Edit) (4:00)

Side B
 "You Think You Know Her" (The Promiscuous Mix) (7:16)
 "You Think You Know Her" (Promiscuous Instrumental) (4:51)
 "You Think You Know Her" (Promiscuous Edit) (4:43)

CD maxi-single

Catalog #:NMR 74002-2

 "You Think You Know Her" (7" Version) (4:35)
 "You Think You Know Her" (The Deceptive Edit) (4:00)
 "You Think You Know Her" (Promiscuous Edit) (4:43)
 "You Think You Know Her" (The Deception Mix) (8:00)
 "You Think You Know Her" (The Promiscuous Mix) (7:16)
 "You Think You Know Her" (The Devious Dub) (7:10)
 "You Think You Know Her" (Promiscuous Instrumental) (4:51)

Cassette single
Catalog #:72445-14025-4

 "You Think You Know Her" (4:43)
 "New World" (4:45)

CD promo maxi-single
Catalog #:ZP17043-2
 "You Think You Know Her" (7" Remix Edit) (4:43)
 "You Think You Know Her" (7" Edit) (4:38)
 "You Think You Know Her" (Unfaithful Edit) (4:00)
 "You Think You Know Her" (Unfaithful Mix) (8:00)
 "You Think You Know Her" (Philanderers Mix) (7:16)
 "You Think You Know Her" (Unfaithful Dub) (7:10)
 "You Think You Know Her" (Philanderers Dub) (4:51)

Chart positions

References 

1990 songs
1990 singles
Cause and Effect (band) songs
Zoo Entertainment (record label) singles